Nikolaus Creutzer, O.F.M. (died 2 October, 1525) was a Roman Catholic prelate who served as Bishop of Pedena (1523–1525).

Biography
Nikolaus Creutzer was ordained a priest in the Order of Friars Minor. On 30 January 1523, he was appointed during the papacy of Pope Adrian VI as Bishop of Pedena. He served as Bishop of Pedena until his death on 2 October 1525.

References 

16th-century Roman Catholic bishops in Croatia
Bishops appointed by Pope Adrian VI
1525 deaths
Franciscan bishops